

Grant Palmer is a family-owned bus operator.

Grant Palmer was established in 1999. From small beginnings, the business has grown to run a fleet of 35 buses on a network of local bus services and bespoke contracts, serving the communities of Bedfordshire, all run from a modern depot in Flitwick.

History
The business was started in October 1999 by Grant Palmer with two double-decker buses and two school contracts. In 2011, the company moved to its current base in Flitwick.

Ticketing
In October 2021, the firm launched the "Cygnet" ticket in Bedford along with competitors Stagecoach East and Uno. The tickets are valid on all three companies' services.

Fleet
In 2019, it had a fleet of 35 buses. Most of its fleet consists of buses manufactured by Alexander Dennis.

References

1999 establishments in England
Transport companies established in 1999
Bus operators in Bedfordshire